An encyclical was originally a circular letter sent to all the churches of a particular area in the ancient Roman Church. At that time, the word could be used for a letter sent out by any bishop. The word comes from the Late Latin  (originally from the Latin , a Latinization of Greek , meaning "circular", "in a circle", or "all-round", also part of the origin of the word encyclopedia). The term has been used by Catholics, Anglicans and the Eastern Orthodox Church.

Catholic usage
Although the term "encyclical" originally simply meant a circulating letter, it acquired a more specific meaning within the context of the Catholic Church. In 1740, Pope Benedict XIV wrote a letter titled Ubi primum, which is generally regarded as the first encyclical. The term is now used almost exclusively for a kind of letter sent out by the pope.

For the modern Roman Catholic Church, a papal encyclical is a specific category of papal document, a kind of pastoral letter concerning Catholic doctrine, sent by the pope and usually addressed especially to patriarchs, primates, archbishops and bishops who are in communion with the Holy See. The form of the address can vary widely and may concern bishops in a particular area, or designate a wider audience. Papal encyclicals usually take the form of a papal brief because of their more personal nature as opposed to the formal papal bull. They are usually written in Latin, and like most papal documents the title of the encyclical is usually taken from its first few words (its incipit).

Papal use
In the encyclical Humani generis, Pope Pius XII held that papal encyclicals, even when they are of ordinary magisterium, can nonetheless be sufficiently authoritative to end theological debate on a particular question:

On social issues, Pope Leo XIII promulgated the encyclical Rerum novarum (1891), which was followed by Quadragesimo anno (1931) of Pius XI and Centesimus annus (1991) of John Paul II. Pope Pius XII issued ten encyclicals, mostly after 1945, three of them protesting against the Soviet invasion of Hungary which suppressed the Hungarian Revolution in 1956: Datis nuperrime, Sertum laetitiae and Luctuosissimi eventus. Pope Paul VI published an encyclical Humanae vitae on the topic of birth control.

Anglican usage
Amongst Anglicans the term encyclical was revived in the late 19th century. It is applied to circular letters issued by the English primates.

Important Eastern Orthodox encyclicals 
 Encyclical of the Eastern Patriarchs (1848)
 Patriarchal encyclical of 1895
 Patriarchal encyclical of 1920
 Patriarchal encyclical of 2012

References

Sources
 The Oxford Dictionary of the Christian Church (3rd. ed.), p. 545.

External links

List of papal documents at the Theology Library
Papal Encyclicals at GCatholic
www.papalencyclicals.net, texts of most of the encyclicals from recent centuries

 
Christian literary genres